Wyeth is a surname.  Notable people with the name include:

N. C. Wyeth (1882–1945), American artist, or one of his family:
daughter Henriette Wyeth (1907–1997), artist
daughter Carolyn Wyeth (1909–1994), artist
son Nathaniel C. Wyeth (1911–1990), mechanical engineer and inventor
grandson Howard Wyeth (1944–1996), drummer and pianist
daughter Ann Wyeth McCoy (1915–2005), artist
son Andrew Wyeth (1917–2009), artist
grandson Jamie Wyeth (born 1946), artist
 Adam Wyeth (born 1978), English poet, playwright and essayist
 Alison Wyeth (born 1964), English long-distance runner
 Arthur Wyeth (1887–1971), Australian cricket umpire
 Ezra Wyeth (1910–1992), Australian cricketer
 Huston Wyeth (1863–1925), American businessman
 John Wyeth (1770–1858), American printer
 John Allan Wyeth (1845–1922), American Confederate veteran and surgeon
 Joseph Wyeth (1663–1731), English Quaker merchant
 Katya Wyeth (born 1948), German-born American model and actress 
 Marion Sims Wyeth (1889–1982), American architect
 Nathan C. Wyeth (1870–1963), American architect, designer of the Oval Office and West Wing
 Nathaniel Jarvis Wyeth (1802–1856), American inventor, ice harvester, explorer and trader
 Steven Wyeth, British football commentator